Alice MacDonell (31 January 1854 – 12 October 1938) was a Scottish poetess who claimed to be Chieftainess of the MacDonell clan of Keppoch, and was recognised as bardess to that clan.

Her full name and title was Alice Claire MacDonell of Keppoch, or in Scottish Gaelic Ailis Sorcha Ni' Mhic 'ic Raonuill na Ceapaich. She wrote verses as “Alice C. MacDonell of Keppoch”.

Life 
Born in 1854 at Kilmonivaig in the Scottish Highlands, Alice MacDonell was the youngest child and eighth daughter of Angus McDonnell (titled Angus XXII of Keppoch) and his wife Christina (née MacNab). Her great-great grandfather was the Keppoch who led the MacDonalds at Culloden.
She was educated by private tuition, and at the Convent of French Nuns in Northampton and at St. Margaret's Convent, Edinburgh. She gave early signs of the gift of poetry, stringing together couplets on incidents she had heard, her favourites being tales of battle and chivalry. She was steeped in the Jacobite sentiment of her ancestors, composing about the heroics of the Rising, though she also included more contemporary examples such as The Highland Brigade at the Battle of the Alma, The Rush on Coomassie, and the Gordon Highlanders at Dargai Heights.

She was Bardess to the Clan MacDonald Society.  Her poetry was composed in English, with occasional use of nominal Gaelic titles.

She did not marry.

In 1911, she was living with her sister Josephine in Streatham, London.

She died on 12 October 1938 in Hove, East Sussex, England.

Works 
An incomplete list of her works includes

Books of poems
Lays of the heather: poems, dedicated to Prince Rupert of Bavaria, London: E. Stock (1896) from Songs of the mountain and the burn, London: J. Ouseley (1912) 
The royal ribbon,  Edinburgh: T. Allan (192- ?) 
The crushing of the lilies, Edinburgh: T. Allan (1927) 
For God and St. Andrew, Edinburgh: (1928) 
The Glen o’ dreams, Edinburgh: T. Allan (1929)

Poems
The Weaving of the Tartan poem in Celtic Monthly (1894)
Culloden Moor (Seen in Autumn Rain)
Lochabair gu Bràch (Lochaber for Ever) introductory poem to Loyal Lochaber and its Associations, by W. Drummond Norie. Glasgow: Morison Brothers (1898) 
The mother land poem in the year book of the MacDonald Society (1899)

Articles
Deirdre: The Highest Type of Celtic Womanhood, from The Celtic Review Vol.8 No.32 (1913) p. 347
Unforgotten, in The Irish Monthly Vol.56 No.656 (1 February 1928) p. 65

Songs
The Thin Red Line (Of the Highlanders at Balaclava), monologue with piano, music by Stanley Hawley. London: Bosworth & Co., Recitation music series No.12 (1896) 
The Lad with the Bonnet of Blue from Lays of the heather, music by Colin McAlpin, London: Cary & Co. (1899) 
The Doom of Knocklea, music by Colin McAlpin, unpublished
Our Heroe's welcome, music by Colin McAlpin
Gillean an fhèilidh ("The kilted lads") from A' tarraing às an tobar: tionndaidhean ùra de dh'òrain thraidiseanta ann an Gàidhlig agus Albais, a' tarraing o na clàran aig Tobar an Dualchais ("Raisin the riches: new arrangements of traditional Gaelic and Scots songs, drawing on the Kist o Riches") Sleat, Isle of Skye: Sabhal Mòr Ostaig ("Great Barn of Ostaig" higher education college), Tobar an Dualchais (Kist o Riches Project) (2014)

Notes

References

Bibliography 
 Keith Norman MacDonald, M.D. MacDonald Bards from Mediæval Times (reprinted from the "Oban Times") Edinburgh: Norman MacLeod (1900) 
 Sir Thomas Innes of Learney The Tartans of the Clans and Families of Scotland Edinburgh: W. & A.K. Johnston (1938)

Further reading 
Am Baile Highland History & Culture website

External links 
Descent from Adam Alice Claire MacDonell, Chieftainess of Keppoch
Descent from Adam Culloden Moor by Alice MacDonell of Keppoch
Scottish Poetry Library Lochaber for Ever by Alice MacDonell
Rampant Scotland: Scottish Poetry Selection The Weaving of the Tartan by Alice MacDonell

1854 births
1938 deaths
Scottish poets
Scottish women poets